Grevillea velutinella is a shrub of the genus Grevillea native to an area in the Kimberley region of Western Australia.

Description
It blooms between March to July and produces an axillary or terminal raceme regular inflorescence with green, cream or yellow flowers with green, cream or yellow styles.

Taxonomy
The species was first formally described by the botanist Donald McGillivray in 1986 as a part of the work New Names in Grevillea (Proteaceae).

Distribution
The shrub is confined to an area in the north west of Australia from around Mornington Sanctuary in the south west to around Kununurra in the north west. It is often situated on rocky hillsides and ridges growing in skeleton soils that overlay areas of quartzite or sandstone.

See also
 List of Grevillea species

References

velutinella
Proteales of Australia
Eudicots of Western Australia
Taxa named by Donald McGillivray